The Valserhorn (also spelled Valser Horn) is a summit of the Lepontine Alps, situated between Vals and Nufenen in the canton of Graubünden in Switzerland, on territory of both municipalities. With a prominence of 236 meters it is commonly agreed to be an independent peak to higher Bärenhorn (2929m) one mile to its northeast.

A popular hike starts at Zervreila, passes three remote lakes (Guraletschsee, Amperveilsee and Selvasee) and descends via Selva Alp to Vals. Vals is famous for its spa.

References

External links
 Valserhorn on Hikr

Mountains of the Alps
Mountains of Graubünden
Lepontine Alps
Mountains of Switzerland
Two-thousanders of Switzerland
Rheinwald
Vals, Switzerland